Sidi Khouiled is a town and commune, and capital of Sidi Khouiled District, in Ouargla Province, Algeria. It is located near the provincial capital, Ouargla. According to the 2008 census it has a population of 8,803, up from 4,309 in 1998, and has an annual population growth rate of 7.6%, the highest in the province.

Geography

The land in the area alternates between sand dunes and flat rocky plains with small areas of fertile oases. Sidi Khouiled is encircled by small palm plantations built upon these oases.

Climate

The climate is dry, with frequent high winds, and very hot temperatures in summer.

Transportation

Sidi Khouleid is connected by local roads to Ouargla to the west, as well as the towns of Ain Beida to the south and Hassi Ben Abdellah to the northeast. From Ouargla the N49 national highway connects to Ghardaia to the west and Hassi Messaoud to the east, while the N56 connects (via the N3) to Biskra to the north.

Infrastructure

Access to drinking water is available to 90% of the population, and 85% can use the sewer system. 97% have access to electricity, and 85% have access to gas.

Localities
The commune is composed of three localities:
Sidi Khouiled
Oum Raneb
Aouinet Moussa

External links
 Ouargla Province Official Website - Sidi Khouiled

References

Neighbouring towns and cities

Communes of Ouargla Province
Cities in Algeria